Alfredo, Alfredo  is a 1972 Italian award-winning comedy film co-written and directed by Pietro Germi.

Plot
The film, told mostly in flashback, tells the story of a timid bank clerk (Dustin Hoffman) living in Ascoli Piceno (Italian town located in Marche region) who finds himself swept into dating and marrying a possessive woman (Stefania Sandrelli), the stress he endures as her behavior in their marriage becomes increasingly domineering, and the obstacles he faces in leaving her for another more amenable woman (Carla Gravina), in the times when divorce was still illegal in Italy.

Cast
Dustin Hoffman (dubbed by Ferruccio Amendola): Alfredo Sbisà
Stefania Sandrelli (dubbed by Manuela Andrei): Maria Rosa Cavarani
Carla Gravina: Carolina Bettini
Duilio Del Prete: Oreste
Saro Urzì: Father of Mariarosa 
:the shaman
: Mother of Maria Rosa
Clara Colosimo: Mother of Carolina
: Father of Alfredo
Vittorio Duse (dubbed by Sergio Graziani): judge
 (dubbed by Michele Gammino): assistant of the judge
Renzo Marignano:  doctor

Production
The film was completely shot in Ascoli Piceno, Italy.

Awards
 Golden Globe nominee: Best Foreign Language Film
 David di Donatello: Best Film
 U.S. National Board of Review nominee: Best Foreign Language Film

References

External links

1972 films
1972 comedy films
1970s Italian-language films
Films set in Italy
Films directed by Pietro Germi
Films scored by Carlo Rustichelli
Italian comedy films
1970s Italian films